Walter Lennie Allan (24 December 1868 – 1 November 1943), usually known as Watty Allan, was a Scottish footballer who played as an inside-forward. He played for a number of clubs during his career, most notably Watford and Blackpool.

Having previously played in the Second Division with Rotherham Town and Loughborough, he played one season in the Southern League for Watford at inside-left, scoring one goal. After leaving Watford, he joined Blackpool. He died in the town in 1943, aged 74.

References

1868 births
1943 deaths
Footballers from Paisley, Renfrewshire
Association football inside forwards
Abercorn F.C. players
Stockton F.C. players
Middlesbrough F.C. players
Heywood Central F.C. players
Rotherham Town F.C. (1878) players
Fairfield Athletic F.C. players
Chorley F.C. players
Stalybridge Rovers F.C. players
Northfleet United F.C. players
Kettering Town F.C. players
Manchester City F.C. players
Watford F.C. players
Loughborough F.C. players
Blackpool F.C. players
English Football League players
Southern Football League players
Scottish footballers